Elgeseter Bridge is a bridge in the city and municipality of Trondheim in Trøndelag county, Norway.  It is part of the European route E6 highway which passes over the Nidelva river and connects Prinsens street in the Midtbyen area of Trondheim with Elgeseter street in the Elgeseter area of Trondheim in the south.  The Trondheim city council decided on 17 March 1949 that the bridge should be built. Elgeseter bridge was opened in 1951 after a construction period of 2 years.

History
The main entryway into Trondheim for hundreds of years has been at Elgeseter; the first bridge here is mentioned in 1178. It was on this bridge that the battle between the birkebeiners and the baglers took place in 1199. Two years after the city was destroyed by fire in 1681, the Old Town Bridge was built. Until then the Elgeseter Bridge was the only connection across the Nidelva. The bridge has been reconstructed many times. In the 16th century it was for a period called "Gårdsbroen" and "Kanikke bro". After the Old Town Bridge was completed, the bridge to Elgeseter fell to decay, and collapsed. 
In 1863 a wooden railway bridge was constructed at that location for the Trondhjem-Størenbanen railway line to Trondheim. This bridge was called "Kongsgårds bro".  The railway bridge was converted into a roadway bridge in 1885, after the train station was relocated to Brattøra.

Media gallery

See also
List of bridges in Norway
List of bridges in Norway by length

References

Railway bridges in Trøndelag
Road bridges in Trøndelag
Bridges completed in 1863
Bridges completed in 1951
1951 establishments in Norway
1863 establishments in Norway
Buildings and structures in Trondheim